Kinna is a surname and given name. Notable people with the name include: 

surname
Chris Kinna, Australian rugby player
Patrick Kinna (1913–2009), Winston Churchill's stenographer during World War II
Ruth Kinna (born 1961), British philosopher

given name
Kinna McInroe (born 1973), American actress